After Dark may refer to:

Music

Albums
 After Dark (Kitty Wells album), 1959
 After Dark (Andy Gibb album) or the title song, 1980
 After Dark (Dick Morrissey album), 1983
 After Dark (Ray Parker Jr. album), 1987
 After Dark (Cruzados album), 1987
 After Dark (Music Revelation Ensemble album), 1992
 After Dark (Don Braden album), 1993
 After Dark (The Make-Up album), 1997
 After Dark (Hank Crawford album), 1998
 After Dark (Type O Negative album), a 1998 VHS and 2000 DVD
 After Dark (EP), by Scary Kids Scaring Kids, 2003
 After Dark (compilation album), a compilation album by the Italians Do It Better label, 2007
 Late Night Tales Presents After Dark, a DJ mix album by Bill Brewster, 2013
 Late Night Tales Presents After Dark: Nightshift, 2014
 Late Night Tales Presents After Dark: Nocturne, 2015

Songs
 "After Dark" (Little Birdy song), 2007 A.D.
 "After Dark" (Asian Kung-Fu Generation song), 2007
 "After Dark" (The Count & Sinden song), 2010
 "After Dark", by Blue Öyster Cult from Fire of Unknown Origin
 "After Dark", by Drake from Scorpion
 "After Dark", by Kylie Minogue from Body Language
 "After Dark", by Le Tigre from This Island
 "After Dark", by Style of Eye
 "After Dark", by Tito & Tarantula from Tarantism
 "After Dark", by coldrain from Nothing Lasts Forever
 "After Dark", by Hieroglyphis from 3rd Eye Vision
 "After Dark", by Mr.Kitty from Time

Film and television
 After Dark (1915 film), a British silent film starring Eric Maxon
 After Dark (1932 film), a British crime film starring Hugh Williams
 After Dark (TV programme), a 1987–2003 British television discussion series
 After Dark (Australian TV series), a 1982–1985 late-night chat and music show hosted by Donnie Sutherland
 After Dark, a mini weekly talk-show with some of the cast and crew of the TV series Dark Matter
 After Dark Films, a film production company
 After Dark Horrorfest, an annual Horror movie festival in the USA

Literature
 After Dark (comics), a 2010 science fiction limited series
 After Dark (magazine), an entertainment magazine published from 1968 to 1982
 After Dark (Murakami novel), a 2004 novel by Haruki Murakami
 After Dark (short story collection), an 1856 short story collection by Wilkie Collins
 After Dark, the newsletter of Coast to Coast AM
 After Dark, a book by David Harsent
 Afterdark, a series by Annie Dalton

Other uses 
 After Dark (drag act), a Swedish drag act
 After Dark (Boucicault play), written by Dion Boucicault
 After Dark (Farjeon play), a 1926 play by the British writer Joseph Jefferson Farjeon
 After Dark (software), a series of screensaver software products
 After Dark (Washington University in St. Louis), an a cappella group
 After Dark (whisky), a brand of Indian whisky
 After Dark, the stage name of the musician Carlos Berrios, who appeared on the album Live at the Social Volume 1

See also
 After the Dark, a 2013 American film